The Best Classics... Ever! vol. 2 is a compilation album released by EMI in late 2007.

Track listing

CD 1 (Slavic)
Modest Mussorgsky – "Promende: Allegro giusto, nel modo russico, senza allegrezza, ma poco sostenuto (Pictures at an Exhibition)"
Mikhail Glinka – "Overture (Ruslan and Ludmila)"
Antonín Dvořák – "Symphony No. 8, Op. 88"
Stanisław Moniuszko – "Prząśniczka"
Aram Khachaturian – "Sabre Dance (Gayaneh)"
Henryk Górecki – "Symphony No. 3 Symphony of Sorrowful Songs"
Leoš Janáček – "Sinfonietta, Op. 60"
Nikolai Rimsky-Korsakov – "The Sea and Sindbad's Ship (Scheherazade)"
Dmitri Shostakovich – "The Gadfly Suite, Op. 97a"
Alexander Borodin – "Polovtsian Dances. Introduction (Prince Igor)"
Bedřich Smetana – "Vltava (Ma vlast)"
Igor Stravinsky – "The Firebird" (conclusion)
Antonín Dvořák – "Song to the Moon" (Rusalka)
Frédéric Chopin – "Mazurka No. 2, Op. 63"
Dmitri Shostakovich – "Jazz Suite No 1"
Paweł Szymański – "Sarabande"
Modest Mussorgsky – "Il vecchio castello: Andante (Pictures at an Exhibition)"
Antonín Dvořák – "Slavonic Dances, Op. 72"

CD 2 (German)
Wolfgang Amadeus Mozart – "Symphony No. 40 in G minor"
Johann Strauss II – "Wiener Blut Op. 354" (extract)
Robert Schumann – "Träumerei" (No. 7 from Kinderszenen)
Gustav Mahler – "Symphony No. 3 in D minor"
Johann Sebastian Bach – "Brandenburg Concertos, No. 1 in F BWV1046"
Felix Mendelssohn – "Sonate pour violoncello & piano No. 2"
Johannes Brahms – "Hungarian Dances No. 1 in G minor"
Fritz Kreisler – "Liebesleid"
Franz Schubert – "String Quartet No. 14 in D minor (Death and the Maiden)"
Max Bruch – "Scottish Fantasy, Op. 46"
Wolfgang Amadeus Mozart – "Piano Sonata No. 11, K. 331"
Ludwig van Beethoven – "Für Elise"
Johannes Brahms – "Violin Concerto, Op. 77"
Joseph Haydn – "Symphony No. 83 The Hen"
Richard Wagner – "Prelude (Tristan und Isolde)"

CD 3 (Latin)
Pietro Mascagni – "O amore, o bella luce del core (L'amico Fritz)"
Hector Berlioz – "Symphonie fantastique, Op. 14"
Pietro Mascagni – "Cavalleria rusticana"
Claude Debussy – "Jeux de vagues (La Mer)"
Maurice Ravel – "Violin Sonata"
Ennio Morricone – "Gabriel's Oboe (The Mission)"
Joaquín Rodrigo – "Concierto de Aranjuez"
Heitor Villa-Lobos – "Bachianas Brasileiras No. 2"
Enrique Granados – "Danzas españolas"
Isaac Albéniz – "Malagueña, Op. 165, No. 3"
Camille Saint-Saëns – "The Swan (The Carnival of the Animals)"
Manuel de Falla – "Canciones populares españolas"
Jules Massenet – "Manon!... Avez-vous peur que mon visage frole? (Manon)"
Charles Gounod – "Glorie immortele de nos aieux  (Faust)"
Giuseppe Verdi – "Se quel guerrier...Celeste Aida (Aida)"
Jacques Offenbach – "Overture (Orpheus in the Underworld)"

CD 4 (Rest of the world)
Māori Songs – "Tarakihi (The Locust)"
Leonard Bernstein – "Overture (Candide)"
Ralph Vaughan Williams – "A Sea Symphony, No. 1 Behold, the sea itself"
Astor Piazzolla – "Decarismo"
Franz Liszt – "La campanella"
Edvard Grieg – "Norwegian Dances Op. 35"
Benjamin Britten – "Now the hungry lions roars (A Midsummer Night's Dream)"
Karl Jenkins – "Requiem: Lacrimosa"
Ralph Vaughan Williams – "Fantasia on Greensleeves"
Charles Wood – "Hail, gladdening light"
John Tavener – "Song For Athene"
Paul Dukas – "Scherzo (excerpt) (The Sorcerer's Apprentice)"
William Walton – "Concerto for Viola and Orchestra"
Gustav Holst – "Venus, the Bringer of Peace (The Planets)"
Edvard Grieg – "Cello Sonata Op. 36 / Intermezzo in A minor"
Astor Piazzolla – "Concerto for Bandoneón and Orchestra – Muerte del Angel"
Vanessa-Mae – "Happy Valley (The 1997 re-unification overture)"

Classics
2007 compilation albums